American Geophysical Union v. Texaco, 60 F.3d 913 (2d Cir. 1995), was a U.S. copyright case holding that a private, for-profit corporate library could not rely on fair use in systematically making copies of articles for its employees.

Case background 

Texaco is a for-profit corporation that maintained an internal library and employed a number of scientists. Texaco subscribed to journals published by the American Geophysical Union, a scholarly society that publishes a number of journals. Texaco also purchased a photocopy license from the Copyright Clearance Center (CCC), an entity that licenses academic content to research organizations. Texaco, like many entities with institutional libraries, engaged in the practice of photocopying articles from journals to send to employees.

The AGU and five other publishers, eventually joined by several dozen other publishers, sued Texaco. Texaco defended its actions by citing the fair use doctrine, which holds that uses found to be "fair," "for purposes such as criticism, comment, news reporting, teaching (including multiple copies for classroom use), scholarship, or research," are not infringements of copyright.

The court ultimately deemed Texaco's use not to be fair use; Texaco was fined and agreed to retroactively purchase a license from the Copyright Clearance Center.

The Second Circuit's fair-use analysis weighed heavily on the "fourth factor", which considers "the effect of the use upon the potential market for ... the copyrighted work." Because CCC made licenses available for the photocopying, the court held that Texaco's failure to use those licenses for all its photocopying deprived the rightsholders of lost licensing revenue. This portion of the opinion has been criticized for its circularity of reasoning: Since any use could in theory be licensed, any unlicensed use would weigh against fair use on the market harm factor.

Judge Dennis Jacobs dissented. He characterized the publishers' argument as circular. Since any license fee they would collect would result only if the use was not deemed fair, deeming the use unfair because of the lost licensing fee was bootstrapping.  He also would have treated the scientists' use of photocopies in the laboratory as socially productive and therefore weighing in favor of fair use.

References

Further reading 
 Nicole B. Cásarez, "Deconstructing the Fair Use Doctrine: The Cost of Personal and Workplace Copying after American Geophysical Union v. Texaco, Inc.", 6 Fordham Intell. Prop. Media & Ent. L.J. 641 (1995)
 William Patry, "American Geophysical Union v. Texaco, Inc.: Copyright and Corporate Photocopying", 61 Brook. L. Rev. 429 (1995)
 Carol M. Silberberg, "Preserving Educational Fair Use in the Twenty-First Century", 74 S. Cal. L. Rev. 617 (2000).
 K.L. Still, "American Geophysical Union v. Texaco, Inc.: Expanding the Copyright Monopoly",  29 Ga. L. Rev. 1233 (1994)
 Shannon Waggoner, "American Geophysical Union v. Texaco: Is the Second Circuit Playing Fair with the Fair Use Doctrine?" (Note), 18 Hastings Comm. & Ent. L. J. 181 (1995)
 Sarah K. Wiant, "Users' Right to Photocopy: The Impact of American Geophysical Union v. Texaco and Princeton University Press on Users' Rights to Photocopy", in Growing Pains: Adapting Copyright for Libraries, Education, and Society, ed. by Laura Gasaway (1997)

External links

Fair use case law
United States copyright case law
1995 in United States case law
United States Court of Appeals for the Second Circuit cases
Texaco
American Geophysical Union
United States lawsuits